John N. "Jack" Little is an American electrical engineer and the CEO and co-founder of MathWorks and a co-author of early versions of the company's MATLAB product.

He is a Fellow of the IEEE and a Trustee of the Massachusetts Technology Leadership Council. He holds a Bachelor's degree in Electrical Engineering from the Massachusetts Institute of Technology (1978), and a Master's degree from Stanford University (1980). He is the son of the academic John D. C. Little.

External links 
  His biography on mathworks.com.

References

Fellow Members of the IEEE
MIT School of Engineering alumni
Stanford University School of Engineering alumni
Living people
Year of birth missing (living people)